Sandon is a locality in central Victoria, Australia.

Sandon's housing range mainly consists of farms of approximately 800 acres each.

References

External links

Towns in Victoria (Australia)